The Albany Pump Station, originally the Quackenbush Pumping Station of the Albany Water Works, is located in Quackenbush Square on Broadway in the city of Albany, New York, United States. It is a large brick building constructed in the 1870s and expanded later in the century.

It was built to pump municipal water from the nearby Hudson River, and continued in that use for 60 years. In 1983 it was listed on the National Register of Historic Places. Today it has been partly converted into a popular local restaurant and brewpub, a reuse that drew an award from the Preservation League of New York State. The beers have also received awards at the World Beer Cup and at the Great American Beer Festival. Another area of the building serves as the city of Albany's visitor center.

Building

The pumphouse building complex is part of Quackenbush Square, a small pedestrian mall area named for the nearby Quackenbush House, one of the oldest buildings in Albany. It is located just off Broadway, on the east side of the street just north of, and visible from, the offramp that carries northbound traffic on US 9 from the Dunn Memorial Bridge and Interstate 787 to Clinton Avenue in the city.

Its main block is a two-story four-by-four-bay brick building with a hipped roof shingled in slate. Large elliptically-arched windows, doubled on the second story, fill the west (front) facade. They are trimmed with brick lintels, keystones and stone sills, separated by broad pilasters. A large red sign saying "Albany Pump Station" is at the top of the facade, with "Brewpub and Restaurant" in smaller letters beneath.

A later northern extension is similar. To the south is a two-story brick building used as stables when originally constructed, with rounded windows in that section. A narrow extension protrudes from the north.

Inside, little remains of the original use or equipment. Renovations to create the restaurant, on the east side of the building, retained its industrial character but opened the interior space to create  ceilings. Two 20-ton (18-tonne) cranes were retained and used to hoist the brewery's serving tanks to their current location. The Albany Heritage Area Visitors Center, a gift shop and the Henry Hudson Planetarium are located along the south facade, on Quackenbush Square.

History

Pumping station

Albany's water supply system had grown from wells at the current site of the state capitol in 1670 to several small reservoirs created by damming local creeks by the mid-19th century. The city's explosive growth around the time of the Civil War began to test and strain that network. Eventually the city's water commission decided it could meet present and future demand only by tapping the Hudson directly instead of relying on distant tributaries.

In 1873 it bought land at the corner of Montgomery and Quackenbush streets. Local architect Edward Ogden designed the main block of the current building, and it was built later in the year. It had room for two steam-driven pumps that could move river water to Bleecker Reservoir (now Bleecker Stadium) west of the city. A neighboring house was demolished and a boiler house built on its site.

Five years later, in 1878, it was supplemented by Prospect Hill Reservoir and another pumping station in the west of the city, to serve new neighborhoods growing there. The pump station was expanded in 1895, and again two years later, with the present wings added and another nearby house taken over for office use. Three more pumps were put in service, and the building complex had assumed its current form.

The station continued to draw river water for the city for the next three decades. In 1935, Alcove Reservoir was built  in the countryside south of the city, and Albany's water needs were finally satisfied for the long term. The station pumped its last water in 1937.

Brewpub and restaurant

The station remained in city hands, and was used by the city's water department primarily as a storage facility after it was taken offline. Four decades after that, in 1977, it was extensively renovated. It continued to be used for storage, and suffered structural neglect and decline.

In 1999, a local man named Neil Evans decided to resurrect the brewery his family had run downriver in Hudson, from 1786 to Prohibition. He started the C.H. Evans Brewing Company and bought the building. When he renovated the space he insisted on retaining its industrial ambiance. It has become a popular spot due to its location just northeast of downtown. The following year the Preservation League of New York recognized it with an award for Project Excellence.

Beer writer Lew Bryson has joined in, praising not only the brews on tap but the building, calling it "a great setting for a brewpub". He compares it to similar establishments in other cities located in former industrial buildings: "They're so solid, and so overengineered, that they seem to be the work of giants." C.H. Evans Brewing Company at the Albany Pump Station's original brewmaster, George de Piro, twice won awards at the World Beer Cup:Munich Dunkel took a silver in 2008 in the European-Style Dark category, and Kick-Ass Brown received a 2004 bronze in the American-Style Brown Ale category.  His Kick-Ass Brown also won the Gold Medal in the American-style Brown Ale category at the 2000, 2002 and 2008 Great American Beer Festival.

See also
 Albany Steam Station

References

External links
Albany Pump Station page at Albany Times-Union site.

Buildings and structures in Albany, New York
Beer brewing companies based in New York (state)
Infrastructure completed in 1873
Water supply pumping stations on the National Register of Historic Places
Industrial buildings and structures on the National Register of Historic Places in New York (state)
Companies based in Albany, New York
Restaurants in New York (state)
Food and drink companies established in 1999
Restaurants established in 1999
U.S. Route 9
1999 establishments in New York (state)
National Register of Historic Places in Albany, New York
Water supply infrastructure of New York (state)